Baptiste Thiery (born 29 June 2001) is a French pole vaulter. He is a two-gold gold medalist in the men's pole vault event at the CARIFTA Games.

In 2018, he won the gold medal in the boys' pole vault event at the Summer Youth Olympics held in Buenos Aires, Argentina.

At the 2018 European Athletics U18 Championships held in Győr, Hungary, he won the silver medal in the men's pole vault event. In the same year, he also won the gold medal in the men's pole vault at the 2018 CARIFTA Games held in Nassau, Bahamas. He was the European Athlete of the Month for the month October 2018.

In 2019, he repeated his previous success at the CARIFTA Games with a second gold medal in his event, at the 2019 CARIFTA Games in George Town, Cayman Islands.

References

External links 
 

Living people
2001 births
Place of birth missing (living people)
French male pole vaulters
Athletes (track and field) at the 2018 Summer Youth Olympics
Youth Olympic gold medalists for France
Youth Olympic gold medalists in athletics (track and field)
21st-century French people